Lampreado, also known as Lambreado or “Payaguá Mascada”, is a dish typical of the cuisine of Paraguay, that has a high nutritional value.

This is a delicious fried cake which base is one of the most characteristic features of culinary taste of Northeast of Paraguay: cassava (cassava Manihot = Manihot utilísima, "family plant of Euphorbiaceae which roots are edible and for its high content of starch used to produce a flour which is high in protein).

Origin of name 

While the word "Lambreado" is a degeneration of the correct "Lampreado" there is little data about the origin of the name of this fried cake made of cassava, known in Paraguay as mandioca, and beef.

In Paraguay, a Castilian-Guarani bilingual country, and in Northeastern Argentine (where the Guarani language is also spoken) it is also called "payaguá mascada", an allusion to one of the tribes of the Guarani people ("payaguáes") who populated the Paraguayan geography in pre-Columbian times.

Ingredients 

There are several varieties of "Lampreado." The more traditional ingredients are as follows: cassava/mandioca, boiled and ground beef, garlic, onion, salt, oil and breadcrumbs.

In other varieties that are heavier on the stomach (but which according to many are tastier), pella or pork fat is used, and the starch and cassava are mixed with raw meat.

Preparation 

The preparation process is simple. The cassava is peeled and cooked in salted water until it is reasonably soft but not too soft. It is then mashed and mixed with ground beef, garlic and onions previously fried in oil, and salt and breadcrumbs.

With this mixture, you get “small cakes”, or more properly "tortillas” which are fried in oil.

To reduce its caloric value and its heaviness it's recommended that you serve the tortillas with a mixed vegetable salad.

Further details of interest  

The Lampreado can be kept for several days, and it is ideal for the "avio" (definition taken from the Royal Academy of Spanish Language: "Among pastors and country people, the provision taken to feed the herders for as long as it takes them to return to town or the farmhouse"), also provisions taken by travelers and "troperos" (mainly cattle drivers) to eat during their journey.

In the area of the department of Misiones, Paraguay, it's called "Lambreado", what elsewhere is known by the name of "marinera", made with either beef or chicken.

 According to some scholars of the social history of Paraguay, all the popular Paraguayan cuisine was consolidated as a small family industry after the War of Paraguay against Triple Alliance (Argentina, Brazil, and Uruguay, 1864 and 1870) This was very blunt in caloric content because of the situation of the country after the war made food scarce, for which reason the entire Paraguayan cuisine has high protein content in response to the fact that daily meals were limited.

Further reading
 "Tembi'u Paraguay" Josefina Velilla Aquinas
 "Karu Reka - Paraguayan culinary anthropology," Margarita Miro Ibars.

References

External links 
 Villarrica
 International Special Reports

Paraguayan cuisine
Cassava dishes